Craig Thomas Cacek (born September 10, 1954) is a former Major League Baseball first baseman who played for the Houston Astros in .

References

External links

1954 births
Baseball players from Los Angeles
Houston Astros players
Living people
Major League Baseball first basemen
Charleston Charlies players
Jackson Mets players
Marion Mets players
Memphis Blues players
Pompano Beach Mets players
Portland Beavers players
Spokane Indians players
Visalia Mets players